The Cryptosporangiaceae are the only family of the order Cryptosporangiales, which is a part of the phylum Actinomycetota.

Phylogeny
The currently accepted taxonomy is based on the List of Prokaryotic names with Standing in Nomenclature and National Center for Biotechnology Information
and the phylogeny is based on 16S rRNA-based LTP release 106 by 'The All-Species Living Tree' Project

References

Actinomycetia
Bacteria families